Alfie George Alexander Kilgour (born 18 May 1998) is an English footballer who plays for Mansfield Town.

Career

Bristol Rovers
Kilgour began his career in the academy at Bristol Rovers aged eight, and first featured in the matchday squad for the first team while still an under-18, twice appearing as an unused substitute for EFL League Two games in the 2015–16 season. In February 2016, Kilgour was loaned to Mangotsfield United. After promotion that season, with first team opportunities hard to come by, he was loaned out again, this time to Cirencester Town in September 2016. In December 2016, during a Gloucestershire Senior Cup tie, Kilgour suffered a torn anterior cruciate ligament and a detached hamstring, leaving him needing surgery. In March 2018, he joined Hungerford Town on loan.

In November 2018, Kilgour joined Maidenhead United on loan and made his debut in their televised FA Cup game at home to Portsmouth. In January 2019, his loan was extended until the end of the season. After 19 games and three goals in all competitions, Kilgour was recalled by Rovers in March to boost their defensive options. He made his debut on 12 March when he came on as a late substitute in a 1–0 away win at Gillingham. His first start came eleven days later, playing the entirety of a 2–2 draw away at Plymouth Argyle. At the end of the 2018–19 season, Kilgour was given the award of Bristol Rovers Development Squad Player of the Season. At the end of the 2018–19 season, Bristol Rovers exercised a contract extension for him. He signed a new contract in August 2019. 

He scored his first goal for the club in an EFL Trophy tie against Leyton Orient on 4 December 2019. On 15 February 2020, Kilgour scored his second league goal for the club with a thirty yard screamer to equalise in a 2–1 victory over Blackpool, a goal that would win League One goal of the month for February 2020.

On 4 July 2020, Kilgour signed another new contract with Rovers that would see him stay at the club until the end of the 2022-23 season after having a breakthrough season that saw him make 45 appearances in all competitions before the season was cut short.

On 2 October 2021, Kilgour received the first red card of his career as he was dismissed for a handball in the penalty area that the referee deemed worthy of a second yellow card. Swindon Town dispatched the penalty with just five minutes remaining to go into a 2–1 lead that they eventually added another goal to. Kilgour made his 100th appearance for the club on 16 October 2021, marking it with his first goal of the 2021–22 season to make it 1–1 in an eventual 2–2 draw at Bradford City. In November, Kilgour suffered a knee injury in a 2–2 draw with Tranmere Rovers, having to undergo surgery. Kilgour returned to action in January 2022, playing the entirety of a 2–0 victory over Hartlepool United however suffered an adverse reaction in the days following. In March 2022, manager Joey Barton confirmed that Kilgour had undergone a second knee surgery for the season after they had identified the root cause of the issue and that the defender was likely to miss the rest of the season.

Mansfield Town
On 12 January 2023, Kilgour signed for League Two club Mansfield Town for an undisclosed fee on an eighteen-month contract, bringing his seventeen year association with Bristol Rovers to an end.

Alfie scored on his full debut for Mansfield with a half volley from 16 yards which saw the Stags beat Doncaster Rovers 4-1 at Field Mill.

Career statistics

Honours
Bristol Rovers
EFL League Two third-place promotion: 2021–22

Individual
Bristol Rovers Development Squad Player of the Season: 2018–19
EFL League One Goal of the Month: February 2020

References

External links

Alfie Kilgour at Aylesbury United

1998 births
Living people
English footballers
Association football defenders
Bristol Rovers F.C. players
Mangotsfield United F.C. players
Cirencester Town F.C. players
Hungerford Town F.C. players
Maidenhead United F.C. players
Mansfield Town F.C. players
English Football League players
National League (English football) players
Southern Football League players
People from Bath, Somerset